Walter Orlando Ayoví Corozo (born 11 August 1979) is an Ecuadorian professional footballer who plays for the Monterrey Flash in the Major Arena Soccer League. He previously played as a left winger for Club Deportivo El Nacional in the Ecuadorian league and in the Ecuador national team, primarily in left defense. He is the cousin of fellow footballer Jaime Ayoví, who also plays in the Ecuador national team. He also holds Mexican citizenship.

Club career

Emelec
Ayoví was born in Camarones, Esmeraldas. He was transferred to Barcelona Sporting Club from Emelec on 23 January 2002, for an undisclosed amount. Despite links to several European club sides, including Mainz 05, for whom he played two friendly matches, and Arminia Bielefeld, both of the German Bundesliga, Ayoví remained on Barcelona's squad until 2006.

El Nacional
When he was transferred to El Nacional. In between contracts he has also played for the Al Wasl Club in Dubai, the UAE.

Monterrey
On 7 January 2009 rumors said that Club de Futbol Monterrey were interested in signing him. He was loaned to CF Monterrey shortly after, then made his debut on 6 February 2009 scoring his first goal on the 4th Week match against Estudiantes Tecos.

On 29 March 2009 CF Monterrey took their option to purchase Ayoví after a spectacular game between Ecuador and Brazil. He renewed his Monterrey contract December 2011, with his future firmly set on the club.

Pachuca
On 15 July 2015, after two seasons with Pachuca, his former team came to terms and agreed to release Ayoví.

Dorados de Sinaloa
On 26 July 2015, it was confirmed that Ayoví had signed for newly ascended team, Dorados de Sinaloa, to join his compatriots Marcos Caicedo, Segundo Castillo, and Christian Suárez.

Return to Monterrey
On 9 December 2015, it was confirmed that Ayoví would be returning to the Rayados de Monterrey.

Monterrey Flash
In June 2022, Ayoví returned to professional football by signing with the Major Arena Soccer League's Monterrey Flash.

International career

Ayoví was called up to the final squad for the 2002 FIFA World Cup held in Japan and South Korea. Being one of the youngest members in that Ecuador team, he did not make an appearance in that tournament. He was a regular in the Ecuador national team that qualified for the 2006 FIFA World Cup in Germany but this time, surprisingly, he was not included in the final World Cup squad.

He was, however, called up to participate in the 2007 Copa América and scored a free kick against Colombia in a pre-tournament friendly. His two appearances Copa América came as a substitute against Mexico and as a starter against Brazil.

Ayoví became an important fixture in the Ecuador side that is competing in the CONMEBOL 2010 World Cup qualifiers. He solidified his starting position with a double against neighbors Peru in a 5–1 victory. On 11 June 2009, he scored against Argentina, leading Ecuador to a 2–0 win.

During the CONMEBOL 2014 World Cup qualifiers, Ayoví played in all 16 of the qualifying games for Ecuador, helping the team to qualify for the tournament finals in Brazil. Ayoví went on to play in every minute of Ecuador's World Cup campaign, starting at left back in the team's three Group E matches.

On 31 March 2015, Ayoví was capped for the 100th time by Ecuador in a 2–1 friendly loss to Argentina in New Jersey. Later that year, he was included in Ecuador's squad for the 2015 Copa América and captained La Tri in the opening match of the tournament, a 2–0 loss to hosts Chile in Santiago.

International goals

Honors

Club
Emelec
 Serie A (2): 2001, 2002

El Nacional
 Serie A (1): 2006

Monterrey
 Mexican Primera Division (2): Apertura 2009, Apertura 2010
 CONCACAF Champions League (3): 2010–11, 2011–12, 2012–13

See also
 List of men's footballers with 100 or more international caps

References

External links
 
 
 
 

1979 births
Living people
People from Esmeraldas Canton
Ecuadorian footballers
Ecuadorian expatriate footballers
C.S. Emelec footballers
Barcelona S.C. footballers
C.D. El Nacional footballers
Al-Wasl F.C. players
C.F. Monterrey players
C.F. Pachuca players
Dorados de Sinaloa footballers
Guayaquil City F.C. footballers
Monterrey Flash players
Ecuador international footballers
Expatriate footballers in the United Arab Emirates
Expatriate footballers in Mexico
Ecuadorian Serie A players
Liga MX players
2001 Copa América players
2002 FIFA World Cup players
2011 Copa América players
2014 FIFA World Cup players
2015 Copa América players
Copa América Centenario players
UAE Pro League players
Association football fullbacks
Association football midfielders
FIFA Century Club
Naturalized citizens of Mexico